The 2008 Uzbek League season was the 17th edition of top level football in Uzbekistan since independence from the Soviet Union in 1992.

Overview
It was contested by 16 teams, and Bunyodkor won the championship. Traktor Tashkent and Tupalang Sariosiyo withdrew of 2008 season participation because of financial problems. They were replaced by and OTMK Olmaliq, a team from First League, and  Metallurg Bekabad which as of 2008 season end, was originally relegated to First League, remained in top division. 

Sogdiana Jizzakh and Uz-Dong-Joo promoted from First League. Vobkent FK was relegated in 2007 season.

League table

Season statistics

Top goalscorers

<small>Last updated: 23 November 2008

References
Uzbekistan - List of final tables (RSSSF)

Uzbekistan Super League seasons
1
Uzbek
Uzbek